The Bellingham Giants were a Minor League Baseball team in the Class A-Short Season Northwest League, based in Bellingham, Washington, for two seasons (1995, 1996), and were an affiliate of the San Francisco Giants. After years of struggling attendance, co-owners Jerry Walker and William Tucker moved the franchise south to Keizer, Oregon, and began play in 1997 as the Salem-Keizer Volcanoes.

History
The franchise arrived in 1973 as the Bellingham Dodgers, affiliated with the Los Angeles Dodgers. The club adopted the moniker of their parent club, taking the name Bellingham Mariners, but were commonly referred to as the "Baby M's."

Bellingham enjoyed a long affiliation with the Mariners, lasting eighteen years, through 1994. Following that season, the Mariners signed a player development contract with Everett, who had been a Giants affiliate since 1984, and Everett became the AquaSox. Seattle and San Francisco, essentially swapped affiliates as Bellingham inked an agreement with the Giants. Like their predecessors, who mirrored their parent clubs, the team took the name Giants.

Bellingham went  in 1995 to earn the top spot in the north division, and the Giants faced the Boise Hawks for the league crown. Boise bested Bellingham in the deciding game of the best-of-three NWL championship series. Despite winning a division title, the Giants struggled at the gate, and were last in the league in attendance.

Attendance woes continued as the Giants failed to eclipse fifty thousand in attendance. Following the season, the franchise relocated to Keizer, Oregon, opened a new $7 million ballpark in 1997, and rebranded as the Salem-Keizer Volcanoes.

Ballpark
The Bellingham franchise played at Joe Martin Field, a venue with a seating capacity near 1,600. The park is currently the home of the Bellingham Bells of the West Coast League.

Season-by-season record

Former players
Bellingham Giants players (1995–1996)

References

External links
 Stats Crew Bellingham Giants 

Defunct Northwest League teams
San Francisco Giants minor league affiliates
Defunct minor league baseball teams
Baseball teams established in 1995
Defunct baseball teams in Washington (state)
Baseball teams disestablished in 1996
Bellingham, Washington